Cosmos: A Spacetime Odyssey is a 2014 American science documentary television series. The show is a follow-up to the 1980 television series Cosmos: A Personal Voyage, which was presented by Carl Sagan on the Public Broadcasting Service and is considered a milestone for scientific documentaries. This series was developed to bring back the foundation of science to network television at the height of other scientific-based television series and films. The show is presented by astrophysicist Neil deGrasse Tyson, who, as a young high school student, was inspired by Sagan. Among the executive producers are Seth MacFarlane, whose financial investment was instrumental in bringing the show to broadcast television, and Ann Druyan, a co-author and co-creator of the original television series and Sagan's wife. The show is produced by Brannon Braga, and Alan Silvestri composed the backing score.

The series loosely follows the same thirteen-episode format and storytelling approach that the original Cosmos used, including elements such as the "Ship of the Imagination" and the "Cosmic Calendar", but features information updated since the 1980 series, along with extensive computer-generated graphics and animation footage augmenting the narration.

The series premiered on March 9, 2014, simultaneously in the United States across ten 21st Century Fox networks. The remainder of the series aired on the Fox Network, with the National Geographic Channel rebroadcasting the episodes the next night with extra content. The series has been rebroadcast internationally in dozens of other countries by local National Geographic and Fox stations. The series concluded on June 8, 2014, with home media release of the entire series on June 10, 2014. Cosmos has been critically praised, winning several television broadcasting awards and a Peabody Award for educational content.

A sequel series, Cosmos: Possible Worlds, premiered on March 9, 2020, on National Geographic.

Production

Background
The original 13-part Cosmos: A Personal Voyage first aired in 1980 on the Public Broadcasting Service, and was hosted by Carl Sagan. The show has been considered highly significant since its broadcast; David Itzkoff of The New York Times described it as "a watershed moment for science-themed television programming". The show has been watched by at least 400 million people across 60 countries, and until the 1990 documentary The Civil War, remained the network's highest rated program.

Following Sagan's death in 1996, his widow Ann Druyan, the co-creator of the original Cosmos series along with Steven Soter, and astrophysicist Neil deGrasse Tyson sought to create a new version of the series, aimed to appeal to as wide an audience as possible and not just to those interested in the sciences. They had struggled for years with reluctant television networks that failed to see the broad appeal of the show.

Development

Seth MacFarlane had met Druyan through Tyson at the 2008 kickoff event for the Science & Entertainment Exchange, a new Los Angeles office of the National Academy of Sciences, designed to connect Hollywood writers and directors with scientists. A year later, at a 2009 lunch in New York City with Tyson, MacFarlane learned of their interest to re-create Cosmos. He was influenced by Cosmos as a child, believing that Cosmos served to "[bridge] the gap between the academic community and the general public". At the time MacFarlane told Tyson, "I'm at a point in my career where I have some disposable income ... and I'd like to spend it on something worthwhile." MacFarlane had considered the reduction of effort for space travel in recent decades to be part of "our culture of lethargy". MacFarlane, who has several series on the Fox network, was able to bring Druyan to meet the heads of Fox programming, Peter Rice and Kevin Reilly, and helped secure the greenlighting of the show. MacFarlane admits that he is "the least essential person in this equation" and the effort is a departure from work he's done before, but considers this to be "very comfortable territory for me personally". He and Druyan have become close friends, and Druyan stated that she believed that Sagan and MacFarlane would have been "kindred spirits" with their respective "protean talents". In June 2012, MacFarlane provided funding to allow about 800 boxes of Sagan's personal notes and correspondences to be donated to the Library of Congress.

In a Point of Inquiry interview, Tyson discussed their goal of capturing the "spirit of the original Cosmos", which he describes as "uplifting themes that called people to action". Druyan describes the themes of wonder and skepticism they are infusing into the scripts, in an interview with Skepticality, "In order for it to qualify on our show it has to touch you. It still has to be rigorously good science—no cutting corners on that. But then, it also has to be that equal part skepticism and wonder both." In a Big Picture Science interview, Tyson credits the success of the original series for the proliferation of science programming, "The task for the next generation of Cosmos is a little bit different because I don't need to teach you textbook science. There's a lot of textbook science in the original Cosmos, but that's not what you remember most. What most people who remember the original series remember most is the effort to present science in a way that has meaning to you that can influence your conduct as a citizen of the nation and of the world—especially of the world." Tyson states that the new series will contain both new material and updated versions of topics in the original series, but primarily, will service the "needs of today's population". "We want to make a program that is not simply a sequel to the first, but issues forth from the times in which we are making it, so that it matters to those who is this emergent 21st century audience." Tyson considered that recent successes of science-oriented shows like The Big Bang Theory and CSI: Crime Scene Investigation, along with films like Gravity, showed that "science has become mainstream" and expects Cosmos "will land on hugely fertile ground".

Tyson spoke about the "love-hate relationship" viewers had with the original series' Spaceship of the Imagination, but confirmed during production that they were developing "vehicles of storytelling". Tyson affirmed that defining elements of the original series, such as the Spaceship of the Imagination and the Cosmic Calendar with improved special effects, as well as new elements, would be present. Animation for these sequences was ultimately created by a team hand-picked by MacFarlane for the series. Kara Vallow developed and produced the animation, and the animation studio used was Six Point Harness in Los Angeles, California. The sound of the Spaceship of the Imagination, and sound design in general, was created by Rick Steele, who said of the show: "Cosmos has been, by far, the most challenging show of my career." The updated Spaceship was designed to "remain timeless and very simple", according to MacFarlane, using the ceiling to project future events and the floor for those in the past, to allow Tyson, as the host, to "take [the viewer] to the places that he's talking about".

Music

Episodes

Cast

Broadcast

In August 2011, the show was officially announced for primetime broadcast in the spring of 2014. The show is a co-production of Druyan's Cosmos Studios, MacFarlane's Fuzzy Door Productions, and National Geographic Channel; Druyan, MacFarlane, Cosmos Studios' Mitchell Cannold, and director Brannon Braga are the executive producers.

Fox's CEO Kevin Reilly considered that the show would be a risk and outside the network's typical programming, but that "we believe this can have the same massive cultural impact that the original series delivered," and committed the network's resources to the show. The show would first be broadcast on Fox, re-airing the same night on the National Geographic Channel.

In Canada, it was broadcast simultaneously on Global, National Geographic Channel and Nat Geo Wild. A preview of the show's first episode was aired for student filmmakers at the White House Student Film Festival on February 28, 2014.

Cosmos premiered simultaneously in the US across ten Fox networks: Fox, FX, FXX, FXM, Fox Sports 1, Fox Sports 2, National Geographic Channel, Nat Geo WILD, Nat Geo Mundo, and Fox Life. According to Fox Networks, this was the first time that a TV show was set to premiere in a global simulcast across their network of channels.

The Fox network broadcast averaged about 5.8 million viewers in Nielsen's affiliate-based estimates for the 9 o'clock hour Sunday, as well as a 2.1 rating/5 share in adults 18-49. The under-50 audience was roughly 60% men. Viewing on other networks raised these totals to 8.5 million and a 2.9 rating in the demo, according to Nielsen.

Reception

Critical reception

Cosmos: A Spacetime Odyssey has received highly positive reviews from critics, receiving a Metacritic rating of 83 out of 100 based on 19 reviews.

The miniseries won the 4th Critics' Choice Television Award for "Best Reality Series", with Tyson awarded for "Best Reality Host". The miniseries was also nominated for "Outstanding Achievement in News and Information" for the 30th TCA Awards and 12 Emmy Awards, including "Outstanding Documentary or Nonfiction Series". The program won the Emmy for "Outstanding Writing for Nonfiction Programming" and "Outstanding Sound Editing for Nonfiction Programming (Single or Multi-Camera)", and Silvestri won the Emmys for both "Outstanding Original Main Title Theme Music" and "Outstanding Music Composition for a Series (Original Dramatic Score)". The series won a 2014 Peabody Award within the Education category. In 2014, the Committee for Skeptical Inquiry (CSICOP) presented Cosmos with the Robert B. Balles Prize in Critical Thinking. "Cosmos: A Spacetime Odyssey opened the eyes of a new generation to humanity's triumphs, its mistakes, and its astounding potential to reach unimagined heights."

Criticism
The new miniseries has been criticized by some Christians and the religious right for some of the things stated during the show. Christian fundamentalists were upset that the scientific theories covered in the show opposed the Genesis creation narrative in the Bible. The Catholic League was upset over their claim that the science show smears Catholicism. A spokesman for the League noted how the show focused on Giordano Bruno, whom the Catholic Church turned over to secular authorities to be burnt at the stake for blasphemy, immoral conduct, practice of hermeticism, and heresy in matters of dogmatic theology, in addition to some of the basic doctrines of his philosophy and cosmology, and claimed that the show "skipped Copernicus and Galileo—two far more consequential men in proving and disseminating the heliocentric theory", further claiming that "in their cases, the Church's role was much more complicated".

Home media release
Cosmos: A Spacetime Odyssey was released on Blu-ray and DVD on June 10, 2014 by 20th Century Fox Home Entertainment. The set contains all 13 episodes, plus an audio commentary on the first episode, and three featurettes: "Celebrating Carl Sagan: A Selection from the Library of Congress Dedication", "Cosmos at Comic-Con 2013" and "Cosmos: A Spacetime Odyssey – The Voyage Continues". Exclusive to the Blu-ray version is the interactive Cosmic Calendar.

Sequel series

On January 13, 2018, it was announced that another season titled Cosmos: Possible Worlds would debut on Fox and National Geographic channels. It is hosted by Neil deGrasse Tyson and executive produced by Ann Druyan, Seth MacFarlane, Brannon Braga, and Jason Clark. On November 7, 2019, it was announced that the sequel series would premiere on National Geographic on March 9, 2020, and will also premiere on Fox later that year.

See also
Science and technology in the United States

References

External links

 

2010s American documentary television series
2014 American television series debuts
2014 American television series endings
American sequel television series
American television series with live action and animation
Annie Award winners
Articles containing video clips
Astronomy education television series
Documentary television series about astronomy
Television shows scored by Alan Silvestri
Fox Broadcasting Company original programming
National Geographic (American TV channel) original programming
Neil deGrasse Tyson
Peabody Award-winning television programs
Primetime Emmy Award-winning television series
Television series by Fuzzy Door Productions